Diandrolyra is a genus of Brazilian plants in the grass family.

Species
 Diandrolyra bicolor Stapf - Espírito Santo
 Diandrolyra pygmaea Soderstr. & Zuloaga ex R.P.Oliveira & L.G.Clark - Bahia
 Diandrolyra tatianae Soderstr. & Zuloaga - São Paulo, Bahia, Rio de Janeiro, Espírito Santo

References

Bambusoideae genera
Endemic flora of Brazil
Grasses of Brazil
Bambusoideae